Rune Dahmke (born 10 April 1993) is a German handball player for THW Kiel and the Germany national team.

He participated at the 2016 European Men's Handball Championship.

Personal life
Dahmke's father, Frank Dahmke, also played for THW Kiel, between 1981 and 1991. Since February 2014 he has been a member of the THW Kiel supervisory board.

He is in a relationship with fellow handballer, Stine Bredal Oftedal.

Honours
 European Championship: 2016
 European Championship: 2022

References

1993 births
Living people
German male handball players
Sportspeople from Kiel
THW Kiel players
Handball-Bundesliga players